Timur Arturovich Teberdiyev (born 31 March 1992) is a Russian former football defender.

Club career
He made his debut in the Russian Second Division for FC Mashuk-KMV Pyatigorsk on 16 July 2012 in a game against FC Dagdizel Kaspiysk. He made his Russian Football National League debut for PFC Spartak Nalchik on 27 July 2016 in a game against FC Shinnik Yaroslavl.

References

External links
 
 

1992 births
Sportspeople from Nalchik
Living people
Russian footballers
Association football defenders
PFC Spartak Nalchik players
FC Dynamo Stavropol players
FC Mashuk-KMV Pyatigorsk players